37 Wall Street is a luxury apartment building on Wall Street in the heart of the Financial District in Lower Manhattan, New York City.

History 
It was designed by Francis Kimball and constructed during 1906–1907 for The Trust Company of America, which occupied the ground floor. The building, completed in 1907, stands at 25 floors, plus a penthouse level that includes apartments and a terrace. No longer offices, the building has been converted/restored by Costas Kondylis. It is now 373 rental apartments and a  commercial space for Tiffany & Co's return to Lower Manhattan. The amenities for its residents include a well-equipped gym, a lounge with pool tables and a screening room, as well as the roof-top terrace.

Gallery

Sources
Real Estate Weekly, June 28, 2006
Leasing website

Beaux-Arts architecture in New York City
Financial District, Manhattan
Office buildings completed in 1907
Residential skyscrapers in Manhattan
Trust Company of America
Wall Street